Grammodes bifasciata is a moth of the family Erebidae first described by Vincenzo Petagna in 1787. It is found in Madagascar, eastern Africa, North Africa and other parts of the Mediterranean Basin, including south of France and Israel.

There are multiple generations per year in Africa. Adults are on wing from May to August.

The larvae feed on Rubus, Cistus (especially Cistus salviifolius), Smilax and Polygonum species.

External links

Lepiforum e.V.

Catocalinae
Moths of Madagascar
Moths of Mauritius
Fauna of Seychelles
Moths of Réunion
Moths described in 1787